Wonnegau is a Verbandsgemeinde ("collective municipality") in the district Alzey-Worms, Rhineland-Palatinate, Germany. It takes its name from the larger historical area Wonnegau, which covers the southern part of Rhenish Hesse. The seat of the Verbandsgemeinde is in Osthofen.

The Verbandsgemeinde Wonnegau consists of the following Ortsgemeinden ("local municipalities"):

 Bechtheim
 Bermersheim
 Dittelsheim-Heßloch
 Frettenheim
 Gundersheim
 Gundheim
 Hangen-Weisheim
 Hochborn
 Monzernheim
 Osthofen
 Westhofen

Verbandsgemeinde in Rhineland-Palatinate